Saint Andrew's Primary School is a primary school in San Ignacio, Belize.

Noted alumni include Prime Minister Said Musa.

References

Schools in Belize
Educational institutions with year of establishment missing